Ledgard is a surname. Notable people with the surname include: 

Jimmy Ledgard (1922-2007), English rugby player
Samuel Ledgard (1874–1952), English entrepreneur
Tony Ledgard (born 1971), Peruvian cyclist
Walter Ledgard (1915-1999), Peruvian swimmer
Walter Ledgard Jr. (born 1945), Peruvian swimmer

See also
Ledgard Bridge, crosses the River Calder in Mirfield, West Yorkshire, England